Ruszcza  is a village in the administrative district of Gmina Połaniec, within Staszów County, Świętokrzyskie Voivodeship, in south-central Poland.

The village has a population of  642.

Demography 
According to the 2002 Poland census, there were 613 people residing in Ruszcza village, of whom 50.2% were male and 49.8% were female. In the village, the population was spread out, with 23.2% under the age of 18, 38.7% from 18 to 44, 21.4% from 45 to 64, and 16.8% who were 65 years of age or older.
 Figure 1. Population pyramid of village in 2002 — by age group and sex

References

Ruszcza